Nieporaz  is a village in the administrative district of Gmina Alwernia, within Chrzanów County, Lesser Poland Voivodeship, in southern Poland.

The village has a population of 417, and is home to the Alvernia Studios.

References

External links 

Nieporaz